The Blonde-class cruisers were a pair of scout cruisers built for the Royal Navy in the first decade of the 20th century. Upon completion in 1910–11, they served as flotilla leaders for destroyer flotillas of the First Fleet until 1913 when they were assigned to battleship squadrons. When the First World War began in August 1914, they remained with their squadrons as the First Fleet was incorporated into the Grand Fleet, although they changed squadrons over the course of the war.  did not participate in the Battle of Jutland in mid-1916, unlike her sister ship, which did, but never fired a shot. They were converted into minelayers the following year, but only Blanche actually laid mines. The sisters were reduced to reserve in 1919 and sold for scrap in 1920–1921.

Design and description
These scout cruisers were too slow to lead destroyers in battle or to defend the fleet against enemy destroyer attacks, but they were still used as flotilla leaders. The Blonde class was essentially a repeat of the preceding , albeit with a more powerful armament and less fuel. They were powered by four sets of Parsons steam turbines, each driving two shafts. Their crew consisted of 314 officers and ratings.

The main armament of the Blonde class consisted of ten breech-loading (BL)   Mk VII guns. The forward pair of guns were mounted side by side on a platform on the forecastle, six were amidships, three on each broadside, and the two remaining guns were on the centreline of the quarterdeck, one ahead of the other. Their secondary armament was four quick-firing (QF) three-pounder  Vickers Mk I guns and two submerged 21-inch (533 mm) torpedo tubes.

As scout cruisers, the ships were only lightly protected to maximise their speed. Their conning tower was protected by four inches of armour.

Ships

Service
Both Blonde and Blanche began their careers with destroyer flotillas, Blonde as senior officers' ship for the 7th Flotilla of the Mediterranean Fleet and Blanche with the 1st Destroyer Flotilla of the First Fleet. But the sisters were transferred to the 4th and the 3rd Battle Squadrons, respectively, of the First Fleet in 1913.

Blonde remained with the 4th Battle Squadron through 1916, although she was detached for several months mid year. She had been transferred to the 1st Battle Squadron by April 1917 and was converted into a minelayer later in the year, although she never laid any mines in combat. Similarly, Blanche remained with the 3rd Battle Squadron until January 1916 when she joined her sister in the 4th Battle Squadron. The ship participated in the Battle of Jutland, but was on the unengaged side of the fleet and did not have the opportunity to fire at the Germans. She was detached from the 4th Battle Squadron at the beginning of 1917, presumably to be converted into a minelayer. Blanche was assigned to the 5th Battle Squadron by April and laid some mines at the entrance to the Kattegat in February 1918.

Blonde was in reserve by February 1919 and had been assigned to the Nore Reserve by 1 May, together with Blanche. The sisters were listed for sale by 18 March 1920 and Blonde was sold for scrap on 6 May. Blanche followed on 27 July 1921.

Footnotes

Bibliography

External links

 Blonde class in World War I
 History of the Blonde class

 
Cruiser classes
Ship classes of the Royal Navy
Ships built in Pembroke Dock